The Women's K-1 500 metres event was an individual kayaking event conducted as part of the Canoeing at the 2000 Summer Olympics program.

Medalists

Results

Heats
17 competitors entered in two heats. The top three finishers in each heat advanced to the finals. Fourth-place through seventh-place finishers and the fastest eighth-place finisher advanced to the semi-final.

Overall Results Heats

Semifinal
The top three finishers in the semifinal advanced to the final.

Final

Brunet had won the past three world championships in this event and was undefeated in this event in over two years. High winds delayed the final by five hours. The Canadian led at the halfway mark, but was passed by Idem, competing in her fifth Summer Olympics. Idem defeated Brunet by half a boat length.

References
2000 Summer Olympics Canoe sprint results. 
Sports-reference.com 2000 women's K-1 500 m results.
Wallechinsky, David and Jaime Loucky (2008). "Canoeing: Women's Kayak Singles 500 Meters". In The Complete Book of the Olympics: 2008 Edition. London: Aurum Press Limited. p. 492.

Women's K-1 500
Olympic
Women's events at the 2000 Summer Olympics